Natili. Abu Abdallah Husayn ibn Ibrahim ibn Hasan ibn Khurshid at-Tabari an-Natili ( | Romanization: Abū ʿAbdallāh Ḥusain ibn Ibrāhīm ibn Khūrshīd aṭ-Ṭabarī an-Nātllī), was a Persian physician from Tabaristan.

He flourished in the 10th century, and was a translator of Greek into Arabic. He dedicated, in 990-991AD, an improved translation of Dioscorides' De Materia Medica to the Prince Abu Ali al-Samjuri.

Sources
Carl Brockelmann: Arabische Litteratur (189, 207).

See also
List of Iranian scientists

10th-century births
10th-century Iranian physicians
People from Amol
Year of death missing
Greek–Arabic translators